Silver Air may refer to:

 Silver Air (Czech Republic), a Czech Airline headquartered in Prague
 Silver Air (Djibouti), a defunct charter airline based out of Djibouti
 Silver Air (US), a private jet management and charter company based out of Santa Barbara, California
 Silver Airways, a United States regional airline based at Fort Lauderdale–Hollywood International Airport in Florida